The Rapidan Dam is a concrete gravity dam located on the Blue Earth River in Rapidan Township, near Rapidan, Minnesota in the United States. The dam was constructed for Hydroelectric Power Generation from 1908 to 1910. The dam and reservoir are owned by Blue Earth County, and the power plant and dam are operated by North American Hydro under an agreement with the county. The dam is located just southwest of Mankato, Minnesota.

Blue Earth County operates the Rapidan Dam Park & Campground on the west embankment of the dam for camping, hiking, river access, and recreational activities.

See also 

List of dams and reservoirs in Minnesota

External links 
Eagle Creek Renewable Energy - Rapidan Dam
Rapidan Dam - Blue Earth County, Minnesota
Rapidan Dam Park and Campground - Blue Earth County, Minnesota

References 

Dams in Minnesota
United States local public utility dams
Buildings and structures in Blue Earth County, Minnesota
Gravity dams
Hydroelectric power plants in Minnesota
Dams completed in 1910
Energy infrastructure completed in 1910
Rivers of Minnesota
Bodies of water of Blue Earth County, Minnesota
1910 establishments in Minnesota